NNW may refer to:

Neural network, an interconnected group of neurons or artificial neurons
North-northwest or Nor-norwest, a compass direction (one of the eight "half-winds")
NetNewsWire desktop news aggregator for Mac OS X
 National Nursing Week, observed in the U.S. and Canada, incorporating International Nurses Day
 Net national welfare, another name for Net economic welfare, a proposed national income measure
 New native woodland, areas of reforestation created in the UK by the Woodland Trust